Jazz à Juan is a live album by American jazz saxophonist Lee Konitz recorded in Antibes in 1974 and released on the Danish SteepleChase label in 1977.

Critical reception

Scott Yanow of Allmusic said "The quartet performs unpredictable and sometimes eccentric versions of five standards and a previously unissued rendition of Konitz's "Antibes." Solal, whose chord voicings and use of space are quite original, acts as an equal partner with Konitz and the music is often magical and never overly safe. Worth investigating".

Track listing 
 "Antibes" (Lee Konitz) – 9:13 Bonus track on CD reissue
 "What Is This Thing Called Love?" (Cole Porter) – 10:58
 "Round About Midnight" (Thelonious Monk) – 10:21
 "You're a Weaver of Dreams" (Victor Young) – 8:51
 "The Song Is You" (Jerome Kern) – 8:08
 "Autumn Leaves" (Joseph Kosma) – 3:32

Personnel 
Lee Konitz – alto saxophone
Martial Solal – piano
Niels-Henning Ørsted Pedersen – bass
Daniel Humair – drums

References 

Lee Konitz live albums
1977 live albums
SteepleChase Records live albums